Chiasmia fidoniata is a moth of the  family Geometridae. It is found in Pakistan, India, Thailand and China (Hong Kong).

The wingspan is 28 mm for the wet season form and 25 mm for the dry season form. The antemedial and medial lines of the forewings are broadened into nearly straight bands and there is some fuscous suffusion beyond the postmedial line. The marginal area is suffused with fuscous. The wet season form has a black spot on the postmedial band at the middle, while the dry season form has not. The hindwings have a straight antemedial and broad postmedial band, as well as a black spot at the end of the cell.

References

Macariini
Moths described in 1858